Virginia Public Media may refer to:

 WCVE-FM, a radio station (88.9 FM) licensed to serve Richmond, Virginia, United States
 WCVE-TV, a television station (channel 22, virtual 23) licensed to serve Richmond, Virginia